Iarla Tannian (born 12 April 1984) is an Irish hurler who currently plays at centre back for the Galway senior team.

Tannian made his first appearance for the senior team during the 2007 National Hurling League and immediately became a regular member of the starting fifteen. Since then he has won one Leinster winners' medal and one National Hurling League winners' medal. He was named as the Man of the match by The Sunday Game panel in the drawn 2012 All-Ireland Senior Hurling Championship Final on 9 September.

Tannian was left out of the Galway hurling panel which was named for winter training in October 2016.	

At club level Tannian plays with the Ardrahan club.

Honours
Team
 Fitzgibbon Cup (2) 2005 2007
 Leinster Senior Hurling Championship (1) 2012
 National Hurling League (1) 2010
 Walsh Cup (1) 2010

Individual
 All Ireland Final Man of The Match (1) 2012 (Draw)
 GAA GPA All Stars Awards (1) 2012

References

1984 births
Living people
Ardrahan hurlers
Connacht inter-provincial hurlers
Galway inter-county hurlers